Patrick Burner (born 11 April 1996) is a Martiniquais professional footballer who plays as full-back for Ligue 2 club Nîmes and the Martinique national team.

Club career

Early career
Born in Fort-de-France in 1996, Burner started his football career with OGC Nice's youth teams.

Nice
In 2016, Burner was called up to the OGC Nice first team. On 8 December 2016, the 6th matchday of 2016–17 UEFA Europa League, he made his senior team debut against FC Krasnodar at the Allianz Riviera, playing the full match. On 21 December 2016, Burner made his Ligue 1 debut in a draw against Bordeaux and played the full 90 minutes.

Nîmes 
On 25 September 2020, Burner signed a four-year contract with Nîmes Olympique.

International career
Burner was called up to represent Martinique national team at the 2021 CONCACAF Gold Cup. He debuted in a 4–1 Gold Cup loss to Canada on 11 July 2021.

Career statistics

Club

References

1996 births
Living people
Sportspeople from Fort-de-France
Martiniquais footballers
French footballers
Association football defenders
Martinique international footballers
2021 CONCACAF Gold Cup players
Ligue 1 players
Championnat National 2 players
OGC Nice players
Nîmes Olympique players